Wizards vs Aliens is a British science fantasy television programme produced by BBC Cymru Wales and FremantleMedia Enterprises for CBBC and created by Russell T Davies and Phil Ford. The series focuses on the exploits of 16-year-old wizard Tom Clarke (Scott Haran) and his scientifically gifted best friend Benny Sherwood (Percelle Ascott) in their fight against the Nekross, a magic-consuming alien race who have arrived on Earth with the intention of hunting down wizards and feasting on their magical energies.

Production-wise, Wizards vs Aliens was created to fill the schedule gap left by the Doctor Who spin-off The Sarah Jane Adventures after its cancellation due to the death of the programme's lead Elisabeth Sladen. Despite being produced by the same creative force behind The Sarah Jane Adventures, Wizards vs Aliens has no relation to Doctor Who.

Two series were originally commissioned by the BBC in late 2011. The programme premiered on 29 October 2012 with a first series of 12 episodes (6 two-part serials). Series 2, made up of 14 episodes (7 serials) aired between 28 October to 10 December 2013, while a third and final series of 10 episodes (5 serials) was broadcast between 27 October to 25 November 2014.

Co-creator and former executive producer Russell T Davies stated that the programme could "easily run for ten years". However, in January 2015, it was announced that the series had been placed on hiatus due to budget constrictions.

Premise
Wizards vs Aliens is a science fantasy adventure series which sees the collision of two very different worlds.

The first series focuses on Tom Clarke, a 16-year-old Wizard, and his adolescent best friend Benny Sherwood as they come across the forces of an alien race called the Nekross who have invaded Earth to consume anything or anyone connected to Magic.

The second series continues the battle between the two sides and sheds more focus on magical creatures and locations and Jathro and Kooth's plan to overthrow the Nekross royals.

In the third series, Tom and Benny part ways when Benny receives an opportunity to work with MIT in America. The Nekross return to Earth's galaxy, with Varg, now King Regent of the empire, intending to have vengeance on Tom for turning his sister Lexi into a human (which he did to save her life) and sending her to Earth. He is assisted by his wife Lady Lyzera, who is secretly a sorceress who wishes to take Earth's magic for herself and take over the universe.

Cast and characters

Wizards / Unenchanted
 Scott Haran as Thomas Robert "Tom" Clarke – A football-loving teenage wizard who defends wizardkind and Earth from the alien Nekross. He is Michael and Helen's son and Ursula and Simeon's grandson.
 Percelle Ascott as Benjamin Claude "Benny" Sherwood – Tom's nerdy "unenchanted" best friend whose vast knowledge of science finds its use with Tom's magic against the Nekross. In The Quantum Effect, Benny leaves to study at the Massachusetts Institute of Technology in America but not before bidding farewell to Tom.
 Annette Badland as Ursula Crowe – Tom's happy-go-lucky grandmother, Simeon's wife, and Michael's mother-in-law, a wizard descended from the Magical Line of Crowe. She is also Tom's tutor when training him in magic and spells.
 Michael Higgs as Michael Clarke – Tom's widowed father and Ursula's son-in-law; an unenchanted who works as a veterinarian. His main concern is his son's safety and making sure he grows up without having to rely on magic all the time.
 Dan Starkey as Randal Moon – A hobgoblin who lives in the Chamber of Crowe – the source of the Magical Line of Crowe's magic – and aids the Wizards and their unenchanted allies with his vast knowledge of potions and spells.

Nekross
 Jefferson Hall (Series 1–2), later Kristian Phillips (Series 3) as Varg – King Regent (formerly Prince) of the Nekross; son of the Nekross King, Lexi's older brother and Lady Lyzera's husband, who fights the Wizards with brute strength. Like his father, he is demanding and determined to find all magic on Earth at all costs.
 Gwendoline Christie as Lexi (Series 1–2) – 17-year-old Princess of the Nekross; daughter of the Nekross King and Varg's younger sister, whose strategic skills and in-depth research into Earth's culture helps her kind in their battles against the Wizards and later develops an on-off relationship with Tom. After Tom turned her into a human (which he did to save her life) and sent her to Earth, Lexi is living a peaceful life with her son, Benny Junior.
 Tim Rose and voice of Brian Blessed as The Nekross King (Series 1–2) – King of the Nekross and father to Varg and Lexi. Immobile on the starship Zarantulus due to his obese size, he is in charge of the Royal Family's mission to find and consume all magic on Earth. It was revealed by Chancellor Kooth that the King had consumed Magic for himself and would only send his people scraps, something Varg was surprised to hear. After the start of Series 3, the King is revealed to have retired to avoid devourment.
 Tom Bell as Technician Jathro 15 – A Nekross of the Zarantulus technician class, who assists Varg and Lexi in their schemes against the Wizards while secretly working for his mother, Chancellor Kooth, as part of their plan to overthrow the Royal Family.
 Alex Childs as Lady Lyzera (Series 3) – Queen Regent of the Nekross and Varg's wife; secretly a Nekross Sorceress who schemes to harvest Earth's magic for herself and use it to conquer the universe.

Recurring
 Manpreet Bambra as Katie Lord – Tom and Benny's classmate and Tom's love interest, who is unaware of Tom's true nature. She briefly learns of Tom's nature as a wizard, but believing she couldn't handle the stress of worrying about him in his fight against the Nekross, asks him to perform a spell to wipe her memory.
 Connor Scarlett as Quinn Christopher – Tom and Benny's classmate who used to tease Benny but eventually befriends him. Like Katie, he has no idea of Tom's true nature.
 Victoria Wicks as Chancellor Kooth (Series 2) – A rogue Nekross who temporarily ruled Nekron whilst the Royal Family travelled the universe seeking magic. She is secretly working with her son Jathro to overthrow the Royal Family and become Nekron's permanent ruler.
 Voice of Brian Herring as Stickley (Series 2) – A Hobbledehoy, mischievous magical creature that speaks in rhyme. He resides in the Chamber of Crowe.

Episodes

Series 1 (2012)

Series 2 (2013)
{{Episode table |background=#800000 |overall=5 |overall_type=story |season=5 |title=22 |director=17 |writer=18 |airdate=16 |prodcode=7 |viewers=10 |viewersR= |country=UK |episodes=

{{Episode list
| EpisodeNumber     = 11
| EpisodeNumber2    = 9–10
| Title             = The Thirteenth Floor
| DirectedBy        = Paul Murphy
| WrittenBy         = Phil Ford
| OriginalAirDate_1 = 
| OriginalAirDate_2 = 
| ProdCode_1        = 2.9
| ProdCode_2        = 2.10
| Viewers_1         = 423,000
| Viewers_2         = 380,000
| ShortSummary      = Tom Clarke faces his greatest challenge yet when a mysterious elevator takes him to Floor 13 – a destination leading far beyond this world. While Benny struggles to understand this ancient trap, the Nekross arrive, ready to feast – only to discover that Floor 13 has terrible plans for them too. 
Note: The story was a rewritten version of one intended for Series 5 of The Sarah Jane Adventures. The series' lead actress Elisabeth Sladen died, which led to the cancellation of the program. The episode, therefore, had never entered production.
| LineColor         = 800000
| NumParts          = 2
}}

}}

Series 3 (2014)

International broadcasts and releasesWizards vs Aliens'' made its American debut on the cable channel Hub Network, where it ran from 27 May – 15 June 2013. The series was available on Netflix until December 2018.

In Australia the show airs on ABC 3.

In Poland, the show aired on teleTOON+ between 6 April 2013 – 1 January 2014. In Polish dub, the last episode was slightly censored – Benny's dialogue during his coming out was changed from "I’ll go on a date, one day. Just not with her. Not with a girl" to "I’ll go on a date, one day. Just not with her. Not yet".

In Italy the show aired on Rai Gulp between 2014 and 2015.

References

External links
 
 Weekly top 10 programmes on TV sets (July 1998 – Sept 2018) | BARB
 'Wizards vs Aliens' Season 3 episode guide
 

2012 British television series debuts
2014 British television series endings
2010s British children's television series
2010s British science fiction television series
BBC children's television shows
BBC Cymru Wales television shows
Television series by Fremantle (company)
Television series by FremantleMedia Kids & Family
English-language television shows
Wizards in television
Television about magic
Television series created by Russell T Davies
British children's science fiction television series
British television shows featuring puppetry
Television series about teenagers
2010s British LGBT-related television series